Hashan Sandeepa (born 2 November 1998) is a Sri Lankan cricketer. He made his Twenty20 debut on 15 January 2020, for Burgher Recreation Club in the 2019–20 SLC Twenty20 Tournament. He made his first-class debut on 6 March 2020, for Burgher Recreation Club in the 2019–20 Premier League Tournament.

References

External links
 

1998 births
Living people
Sri Lankan cricketers
Burgher Recreation Club cricketers
Place of birth missing (living people)